Pasión is the debut album from the classical singer Fernando Lima and was released on February 5, 2008 (See 2008 in music).

The title song, "Pasión", is a duet with English Soprano singer Sarah Brightman and is the theme song for the Mexican telenovela of the same name.

Track listing
"Azul"
"Pasion"
"El Condor Pasa"
"Oh Madre Mia"
"El Aranjuez Con Tu Amor"
"Sonn"
"Ave Maria"
"Nana"
"Venezia"
"Pavane"
"Sueno"
"Recuerdos de la Alhambra"
"El Vuelo"
"Guardian Angel"

2008 debut albums
Fernando Lima albums